Nikolay Fyodorovich Kalashnikov (born October 11, 1940) is a Russian water polo player who competed for the Soviet Union in the 1964 Summer Olympics.

In 1964 he was a member of the Soviet team which won the bronze medal in the Olympic water polo tournament. He played all six matches and scored two goals.

See also
 List of Olympic medalists in water polo (men)

External links
 

1940 births
Living people
Russian male water polo players
Soviet male water polo players
Olympic water polo players of the Soviet Union
Water polo players at the 1964 Summer Olympics
Olympic bronze medalists for the Soviet Union
Medalists at the 1964 Summer Olympics